The 2014–15 Eastern Kentucky Colonels basketball team represented Eastern Kentucky University during the 2014–15 NCAA Division I men's basketball season. The Colonels, led by tenth year head coach Jeff Neubauer, played their home games at McBrayer Arena within Alumni Coliseum and were members of the East Division of the Ohio Valley Conference. They finished the season 21–12, 11–5 OVC play to finish in a share for East Division championship. They lost in the semifinals of the OVC tournament to Belmont. They were invited to the CollegeInsider.com Tournament where they defeated Norfolk State in the first round and High Point in the second round before losing in the quarterfinals to fellow OVC member UT Martin.

On March 30, head coach Jeff Neubauer resigned to become the head coach at Fordham. He finished at EKU with a 10-year record of 188–134.

Roster

Schedule

|-
!colspan=9 style="background:#7A0019; color:#FFFFFF;"| Australia summer trip

|-
!colspan=9 style="background:#7A0019; color:#FFFFFF;"| Exhibition

|-
!colspan=9 style="background:#7A0019; color:#FFFFFF;"| Regular season

|-
!colspan=9 style="background:#7A0019; color:#FFFFFF;"| Ohio Valley tournament

|-
!colspan=9 style="background:#7A0019; color:#FFFFFF;"| CIT

References

Eastern Kentucky Colonels men's basketball seasons
Eastern Kentucky
Eastern Kentucky